Isabel Clark Ribeiro (born 24 October 1976) is a snowboarder from Brazil. She competed in the 2006 Winter Olympics, 2010 Winter Olympics and 2014 Winter Olympics in snowboard cross.

In Turin 2006 she made her Olympic debut and achieved the best Brazilian result to that date in Winter Olympics, as she ranked the 9th position in the Snowboard Cross event. Clark was Brazil's flag bearer during the 2010 Winter Olympics opening ceremony. She qualified for the 2018 Winter Olympics 
but was injured in an accident during a training session the day before the competition.

References

External links

Brazilian female snowboarders
Olympic snowboarders of Brazil
Snowboarders at the 2006 Winter Olympics
Snowboarders at the 2010 Winter Olympics
Snowboarders at the 2014 Winter Olympics
1976 births
Living people
Sportspeople from Rio de Janeiro (city)